Mister World Philippines is a beauty pageant in the Philippines that selects the country's representatives to the Mister World pageant.

History 
The first Mister World representative under Miss World Philippines is Andrew Wolff who placed first runner-up in the Mister World 2012 pageant. In 2014, two contenders were appointed as representatives, John de Lara Spainhour for the 2014 edition and Sam Valdes Ajdani for the 2016 edition.

Under the new directorship of Vegafria, in 2018, the Mister World representative for the first time selected via Mister World Philippines contest instead of appointment.

Aside from Mister World, the contest also selected the representative to Mister Supranational, Mister Eco International, and Mister Multinational.

Editions 
Below is the complete list of Miss World Philippines editions.

Titleholders

Current Franchises

Mister World

Mister Supranational

Mister Eco International

Mister Multinational

References

Mister World
Beauty pageants in the Philippines